Philippe Reinhardt (born 14 May 1981 in Zurich) is a Swiss actor.

Early life
Philippe Reinhardt grew up in Zurich, Switzerland. After attending acting classes in Munich, Hamburg and Zurich, he got his first stage-roles at German and Swiss theatres.

Career
His first roles were for German television-series, but quickly followed by movie offers such as the German comedy 1½ Knights – In Search of the Ravishing Princess Herzelinde along star Til Schweiger. The same year he also starred in the Swiss film Champions. This was followed by a role in the disaster movie Faktor 8 for German network ProSieben. He also got the lead role in the short film Der Zauberregen alongside German actress Alexandra Kamp. In Bern's Theater at the Effingerstrasse he was on stage for the play Sein oder Nichtsein. In 2010 he starred in the feature film Simplify your soul for the screenwriter and director Markus Boestfleisch.
By 2012 he also started being cast in international productions, most notably Andrey Malyukov's historical World War II soccer-drama Match and Fedor Bondarchuk's 3D-production Stalingrad, which was Russia's official entry for the foreign-language Oscars in 2013.

He gained notoriety mainly through his starring role in The Groom, the most successful Russian film 2016 in Russia with 3 million moviegoers and more than 20 million viewers of the free-TV premiere.

In 2018 he played in the Russian war drama film  Sobibor that is based on the real story that happened in 1943 in the Sobibor death camp in German-occupied Poland. The film was selected as the Russian entry for the  Best Foreign Language Film at the 91st Academy Awards.

In 2021, Philippe Reinhardt starred in the 6th film of the ARD series Die Diplomatin, entitled Mord in St. Petersburg, in the role of a Russian spy.

Personal life
Philippe Reinhardt lives in Berlin and Zurich.

Partial filmography

2004: Querschläger
2004: The Love I Stole (Short) - Steffi
2005: Der siebte Gang
2005: Jean-Luc
2005: Hey Chef
2007:  - Norman
2007: Miss Luzifer (Short) - Teufelchen
2007-2008: SOKO 5113 (TV Series) - Verhandlungsführer / Gärtner
2007: Unter meinem Bett
2008: Der Schatten des Geldes
2008: Alarm für Cobra 11 – Die Autobahnpolizei (TV Series) - Türsteher (uncredited)
2008: 1½ Knights – In Search of the Ravishing Princess Herzelinde - Kettenhund
2009: Faktor 8 – Der Tag ist gekommen (TV Movie) - Moritz
2009: Champions - Journalist
2010: The quartering act (Short) - Thomas
2010: Der Zauberregen (Short) - Max
2010: Die Mike-Lenn-Vision
2011: Da kommt Kalle (TV Series) - Sigmar Behrens
2012: Nachtexpress - Hoger
2012: Match - Max
2012: Overbooked – Leuchtturm, Leichen & Pasteten - Harald Bloch
2012: Выжить после
2013: Stalingrad - Gotfrid
2014: The Perfect Husband - Hans
2014: Simplify your soul - Karl Rothstein
2016: Ya uchitel - Kuns
2016: Erwartungen - Torsten
2016: Seitenwechsel - Mann in der Bar
2016: The Groom - Helmut
2017: Strassenkaiser - Adrian
2018: Sobibor - Siegfried Greitschus
2019: Conquest - Zims
2019: Love Made Easy - Erik
2019-2022: True North - Lüthi
2020: Bail
2020–2022: Contamin
2021: The Match - Henckel
2021: Die Diplomatin – Mord in St. Petersburg
2022: Diversant

External links 
 
 Website for Philippe Reinhardt

Living people
1981 births
Swiss male television actors
Swiss male film actors
21st-century Swiss male actors
Male actors from Zürich